Manouchehr Vossough (born Abbas Rezayi Vossough; 4 February 1944 – 27 February 2022) was an Iranian actor and film producer.

Life and career
Vosough was born in Iran on 4 February 1944. He later moved to London, England, where he died from cancer, on 27 February 2022, at the age of 78.

Filmography
1980 Mosht-e mard as Ali
1979 Hokm-e tir
1973 The Kiss on Blood Lips as Shahbal
1973 Zan-e bākere as Borzū
1972 Lollipop as Rahbar
1971 Badnām as Mortezā
1971 Kākoū
1971 Khoshgeltarin zan-e 'ālam
1970 Bride of Bianca
1968 Charkh-e bāzigar
1968 The Daughter of the King of Fairies
1968 Pol-i be sū-ye behesht
1966 Hossein Kord Shabestari as Eskandar KhKn

References

External links
 

1944 births
2022 deaths
People from London
People from Tehran
Iranian film producers
Iranian male film actors
Iranian emigrants to the United Kingdom
Naturalised citizens of the United Kingdom